Willie Joyce (born 1950) is an Irish former Gaelic footballer who played as a midfielder for the Galway senior team.

Joyce joined the team for a pre-season game in 1969 and was a regular member of the starting fifteen until his retirement at the end of the 1984 championship. During that time he won six Connacht medals, one National League medal and one All-Star award. He is almost unique in having lost four All-Ireland finals during his career.

Joyce enjoyed a lengthy club career with Killererin, winning Connacht medals and two county championship medals.

References

1950 births
Living people
Gaelic football managers
]
Connacht inter-provincial Gaelic footballers
Galway inter-county Gaelic footballers
Killererin Gaelic footballers